David Köler, also Koler, Colerus (c. 1532 – 1565) was a German composer.

Life 
Köler was born and died in Zwickau. He was educated in his native town and at the University of Ingolstadt. From 1554 he was probably Kantor in Schlaggenwald in Bohemia. In 1556-7 he moved to Joachimsthal and then in Altenburg. In 1563 he was appointed Kapellmeister at the court of Mecklenburg at Schwerin serving the Duke Johann Albrecht. In 1565 he was back to Zwickau where he died few months later.

Works 
Zehen Psalmen Davids, 5, 6vv (Leipzig, 1554)
Rosa florum gloria, 1567
Mass (on Josquin's Benedictus es coelorum regina), 7vv
Kyrie, Gloria, 4vv
Non nobis, Domine, 5vv
Te sanctum, responsory, 6vv
Veni Sancte Spiritus, 4, 5vv
Ach Herr, straf mich nicht in deinem Zorn (Ps vi), 6vv
Hülf, Herr, die Heiligen haben abgenommen (Ps xii), 6vv
Richte mich Gott (Ps xliii), 6vv
Eile, Gott, mich zu erretten (Ps lxx), 6vv
Wer unter dem Schirm des Höchsten sitzt (Ps xci), 6vv
Siehe, wie fein und lieblich (Ps cxxxiii), 6vv

Sources 
Walter Blankenburg's article in New Grove Dictionary of Music
G. Eismann: David Köler: ein protestantischer Komponist des 16. Jahrhunderts (Berlin, 1956)

Bibliography 
  
 Georg Eismann: David Köler: ein protestantischer Komponist des 16. Jahrhunderts. Berlin: Evangelische Verlags-Anstalt 1956

External links 
 

1530s births
1565 deaths
Year of birth uncertain
People from Zwickau
16th-century German composers